WTRW (94.3 FM) is a commercial Talk radio station licensed to Carbondale, Pennsylvania, and serving the Wilkes Barre-Scranton area of Northeastern Pennsylvania. The station broadcasts a talk radio format and is owned by the Bold Gold Media Group, LP.

Programming
WTRW has a weekday schedule mostly made up of nationally syndicated conservative talk shows: Hugh Hewitt, Sean Hannity, Dennis Prager, Mark Levin, Brian Kilmeade, Chris Plante, "Red Eye Radio", “Our American Stories” with Lee Habeeb, and "This Morning, America's First News with Gordon Deal."

Weekends feature shows on money, health, technology, real estate and law, with a Sunday afternoon polka music show.  Weekend hosts include Glenn Beck, Rich Valdés, Bill Handel and Rich Demuro.  Most hours begin with Fox News Radio.

History
On October 12, 1981, the station changed its call sign to WLSP-FM, and on August 5, 1988 to WSGD-FM.

As WSGD-FM, the station broadcast an oldies format under three different names: "Solid Gold 94", "Cool 94", and (after its sale to Citadel Broadcasting) "Big Oldies", which simulcast with Dallas-licensed 93.7 WDLS.

On May 22, 1998, the station (94.3) changed its call sign to WCTP.  93.7 and 94.3 spent that weekend (Memorial Day weekend) stunting with nothing but Garth Brooks music, before launching as "Cat Country 94" the following Tuesday.

On December 8, 2000, the station changed its call letters to WBHD. The country format ended, and the station began stunting for several days as "The Love Channel", broadcasting a continuous loop of phoned-in voices of people seeking dates and relationships.  After that, the station began simulcasting Mountain Top-licensed top 40 station WBHT.

On April 19, 2002, the station changed call letters again, this time to WCWI. The WBHT simulcast remained until the fall, when it was then replaced by a relaunched "Cat Country 94".  That branding lasted for only a few months before Citadel put the station up for sale and replaced Cat Country 94 with a simulcast of Citadel Allentown-based WCTO ("Cat Country 96").

In the Winter of 2004, the station was sold to Route 81 Radio. On February 10, 2004, the station changed call letters to WNAK-FM and began simulcasting Nanticoke-licensed adult standards-formatted WNAK.

On July 5, 2006, the station changed call letters once again, this time to WLNP.  The WNAK simulcast gave way to adult contemporary-formatted "Lite 94.3".

On February 1, 2010, Bold Gold Media closed on its purchase of WLNP and began temporarily simulcasting the format of co-owned "The River", WWRR 104.9 FM. On February 19, 2010,  WLNP changed calls to WTRW.

On March 23, 2010, WTRW changed to a conservative talk format, branded as "94.3 FM The Talker".  Along with nationally-syndicated shows, WTRW featured local morning host David Madeira from May 2012 until December 2015.

References

External links

1979 establishments in Pennsylvania
TRW
Radio stations established in 1979